Boban Božović (born 24 November 1963) is a retired Bosnian-Herzegovinian midfielder who played for SFR Yugoslavia.

Club career
He was a member of the memorable Sarajevo squad that won the 1984–85 Yugoslav First League.

International career
He made his debut for Yugoslavia in a November 1983 friendly match against France, coming on as a second half substitute for Zlatko Kranjčar. It remained his sole international appearance.

References

External links

 Profile on Serbian federation site
 Profile
 

1963 births
Living people
Footballers from Sarajevo
Serbs of Bosnia and Herzegovina
Association football midfielders
Yugoslav footballers
Yugoslavia international footballers
Bosnia and Herzegovina footballers
FK Sarajevo players
RC Lens players
FC Istres players
Montluçon Football players
Gazélec Ajaccio players
Yugoslav First League players
Championnat National players
Ligue 1 players
Ligue 2 players
Championnat National 2 players
Yugoslav expatriate footballers
Bosnia and Herzegovina expatriate footballers
Expatriate footballers in France
Yugoslav expatriate sportspeople in France
Bosnia and Herzegovina expatriate sportspeople in France